Ranjit Singh Sarkaria (16 January 1916 – 12 October 2007) was an Indian Supreme Court justice from 17 September 1973 until 15 January 1981.

Early life 
Sarkaria was born on 16 January 1916. He attended Mohindra College in Patiala and later obtained an LL.B. from the Government College Lahore, in what is now Pakistan.

Career 
Upon obtaining a law degree Shri Sarkaria worked in Patiala as a pleader. He later took a position as an advocate of the Patiala High Court in 1940. Sarkaria was one of two people on a committee created by the state government of the former Patiala and East Punjab States Union (Pepsu) whose role was to translate the new Constitution of India into the Punjabi language.

Sarkaria served as a judge on the Punjab and Haryana High Court from 13 June 1967 until 26 September 1967. He also served as a puisne judge from 27 September 1967 to 15 September 1973.

Sarkaria was appointed to the Supreme Court of India on 17 September 1973. He served on the court until his retirement on 15 January 1981.

Following his retirement, Sarkaria was commissioned in 1983 by the government of Prime Minister Indira Gandhi to study the relationships between the central and state governments of India. The committee became known as the Sarkaria Commission, since it was headed by RS Sarkaria. The Sarkaria Commission submitted its findings in 1988.

Additionally, Sarkaria served as the former chairman of the Press Council of India.

Death 
He died of a prolonged illness on Friday, 12 October 2007, in Chandigarh, India at the age of 91.

References

Justices of the Supreme Court of India
20th-century Indian judges
1916 births
2007 deaths
Judges of the Punjab and Haryana High Court
Recipients of the Padma Shri in civil service
People from Patiala